Brigadier Ian Hamilton Burrows  (11 November 1930 – 22 July 2006) was a senior New Zealand Army officer. He served with the New Zealand Special Air Service in Malaya in 1955 as one of the "originals" before going on to senior command positions in the New Zealand Army, culminating in his promotion to brigadier and appointment as Commander of Land Forces New Zealand in 1981.

Background
Burrows was educated at Waitaki Boys' High School, Oamaru, New Zealand, where he captained the cricket first XI, was a member of the rugby first XV, boxed, played tennis and was noted as a talented artist. In 1950 he was selected to attend the Royal Military College, Duntroon, and was commissioned into the Royal New Zealand Infantry Regiment in 1953.

In 1959, Burrows married Judith Anne Jenkinson, and the couple went on to have four children.

Army career
In 1955 he was selected to deploy to Malaya as a troop commander with the newly formed New Zealand Special Air Service Squadron. On 27 April 1955, Burrows led a patrol, which after two days tracking, located a communist jungle camp. The patrol conducted a dawn assault against the camp, killing the occupants, which included Malaysian Communist leader Li Hak Chi. On 17 October 1955, Burrows led a patrol, which after an arduous ten-hour move through thick jungle and over steep terrain, mounted an immediate attack which killed a terrorist. For these two actions he was awarded the Military Cross and the Negri Sembilan Conspicuous Gallantry Medal from Malaysia.

Following his return to New Zealand, he served as aide-de-camp to Governor General, Lord Cobham, before spending two years as adjutant of the Nelson Marlborough West Coast Regiment. In 1963, Burrows deployed to Borneo, serving as a company commander during the Indonesian confrontation. Upon his return to New Zealand in 1965, Burrows commanded the NZSAS Squadron, before moving on to staff appointments in Wellington. From 1970 to 1973 Burrows served as the Defence Liaison Officer based in Kuala Lumpur, before returning home to be appointed as Commandant of Army Schools. He went on to command the 3rd Task Force Region, in Christchurch, before being promoted to brigadier. He was appointed commander, Land Forces New Zealand between 1981–1983 and commander, New Zealand Forces South East Asia, Singapore from 1983 to 1985, before his final appointment of Commander of Land Forces New Zealand in 1985. He retired from the army in 1985.

Retirement
He was appointed Colonel Commandant of the NZSAS in 1987, a position he held until 1997. Burrows was appointed chairman of the Rothmans Sports Foundation in 1987 and was elected president of the Outward Bound Trust (New Zealand) in 1991.

Honours and awards
In 1957, Burrows was awarded the Military Cross. His citation read:

Also in 1957, he received the Negri Sembilan Conspicuous Gallantry Medal (Pingat Keberanian Chemriang):

In the 1979 Queen's Birthday Honours, Burrows was appointed an Officer of the Order of the British Empire (Military Division).

References

1930 births
2006 deaths
People from Christchurch
People educated at Waitaki Boys' High School
Royal Military College, Duntroon graduates
New Zealand Army personnel
New Zealand recipients of the Military Cross
New Zealand Officers of the Order of the British Empire
Burials at North Shore Memorial Park
New Zealand brigadiers